Ice on Fire is a 2006 Italian drama film directed by Umberto Marino. It was entered into the 28th Moscow International Film Festival.

Cast
 Lucia Antonia
 Raoul Bova as Fabrizio
 Paolo Calabresi
 Stefano Corsi
 Donatella Finocchiaro as Caterina
 Massimiliano Giusti as Mario
 Simona Nasi
 Francesca Vettori

References

External links
 

2006 films
2006 drama films
Italian drama films
2000s Italian-language films
2000s Italian films